Forécariah is a prefecture located in the Kindia Region of Guinea. The capital is Forécariah. The prefecture covers an area of 4,384 km2 and has a 2014 census population of 242,942.

Sub-prefectures
The prefecture is divided administratively into 10 sub-prefectures:
 Forécariah-Centre
 Alassoya
 Benty
 Farmoriah
 Kaback
 Kakossa
 Kallia
 Maférinya
 Moussaya
 Sikhourou 

Prefectures of Guinea
Kindia Region